Hermann Schleinhege (21 February 1916 – 11 March 2014) was a German Luftwaffe fighter ace and recipient of the Knight's Cross of the Iron Cross during World War II. Schleinhege was credited with 97 aerial victories, all on the Eastern Front.

Career
Schleinhege was born on 21 February 1916 in Essen in the Rhine Province of the German Empire. He joined the Luftwaffe before the war and upon completing his training, in February 1941, served as a flight instructor. In April 1942, he was transferred as an Unteroffizier to  6. Staffel of Jagdgeschwader 54 Grünherz (JG 54—54th Fighter Wing), at the time stationed near Leningrad. On 15 May, Schleinhege damaged his Messerschmitt Bf 109 F-4 (Werknummer 8618—factory number) during takeoff at Lyuban.

With the Geschwaderstab of JG 54
After Schleinhege's transfer to the Geschwaderstab (headquarters flight) of JG 54, he began flying as wingman to the unit commanders, including Hannes Trautloft, Hubertus von Bonin (78 victories) and Anton Mader (86 victories), gaining valuable experience. Flying with the Geschwaderstab, he crashed Focke-Wulf Fw 58 Weihe B-1 (Werknummer 3576) near Oryol on 9 July. By the end of the year when they were based in Orsha with Army Group Centre, his score stood at 32 aerial victories.

Schleinhege was awarded the German Cross in Gold on 20 March 1944, and scored his 37th victory on 4 April. Upon completing officer training, the newly commissioned Leutnant Schleinhege was transferred to 4./JG 54 in Estonia, he claimed his 50th on 17 September. On 9 October, now based out of Riga, he shot down two Bell P-39 Airacobras and two Il-2 ground attack aircraft.

Squadron leader
At the end of November 1944, he was promoted to Staffelkapitän (squadron leader) of 8. Staffel of JG 54, remaining in this position until the end of World War II. By the end of the year, with his squadron based in Libau supporting the troops in the isolated Courland Pocket, his score had climbed to 81.

Schleinhege was awarded the Knight's Cross of the Iron Cross on 28 January 1945, for 84 victories. He and his pilots covered the naval evacuation of the pocket. Based firstly from Libau until March, then from Heiligenbeil, near Königsberg, until the end of the war. His last flight was on 8 May 1945 when he squeezed his two mechanics into his (nominally) single-seater Fw 190 and flew to Kiel to surrender to the British troops.

Schleinhege survived the war, and in three years flew 484 combat missions, all on the Eastern Front and all with JG 54. He ended with 97 confirmed victories and a number more unconfirmed, including 54 Il-2 and Pe-2 bombers.

Summary of career

Aerial victory claims
According to US historian David T. Zabecki, Schleinhege was credited with 97 aerial victories. Obermaier also lists him with 97 aerial victories. Spick however lists him with 96 aerial victories claimed in an unknown number combat missions, all of which on the Eastern Front. Mathews and Foreman, authors of Luftwaffe Aces — Biographies and Victory Claims, researched the German Federal Archives and found documentation for 94 aerial victory claims, plus five further unconfirmed claims.

Victory claims were logged to a map-reference (PQ = Planquadrat), for example "PQ 35 Ost 28734". These sectors were then subdivided into 36 smaller units to give a location area 3 × 4 km in size.

Awards
 Flugzeugführerabzeichen
 Front Flying Clasp of the Luftwaffe
 Iron Cross (1939) 2nd and 1st Class
 Honour Goblet of the Luftwaffe on 11 October 1943 as Oberfeldwebel and pilot
 German Cross in Gold on 20 March 1944 as Oberfeldwebel in the Stab/Jagdgeschwader 54
 Knight's Cross of the Iron Cross on 28 January 1945 as Leutnant and pilot in the 8./Jagdgeschwader 54

Notes

References

Citations

Bibliography

 
 
 
 
 
 
 
 
 
 
 
 
 
 
 

1916 births
2014 deaths
German World War II flying aces
Luftwaffe pilots
Military personnel from Essen
People from the Province of Westphalia
Recipients of the Gold German Cross
Recipients of the Knight's Cross of the Iron Cross